Social Aid For the Elimination of Rape (SAFER) is a Canadian humanitarian-aid non-governmental organization that was formed in 2004.

SAFER was created in response to the unprecedented sexual violence in the Democratic Republic of Congo (DRC). The organization works in collaboration with staff at the Panzi Hospital, located on the outskirts of Bukavu, South Kivu, DRC. The Panzi Hospital has attracted a lot of media attention in the West because Dr. Denis Mukwege, the director of the hospital and Congolese gynecologist, treats women that have incurred a fistula condition as a consequence of the trauma of rape.

SAFER's mandate is to partner with African grassroots leaders and hospitals by helping to sustain health programs and increase capacity to improve the status of women in regions where rape is used as a weapon of war. In September 2007, SAFER was featured in an episode of CBC Radio Dispatches as well as CBC The Current on June 21, 2007.

See also 
 Sexual violence in the Democratic Republic of the Congo

External links 
 SAFER website
 Médecins Sans Frontières International

Charities based in Canada
Rape in the Democratic Republic of the Congo
Foreign charities operating in the Democratic Republic of the Congo